Brian J. Lewis (born 1929) is an American politician and engineer in the state of Washington. He served in the Washington House of Representatives and Washington State Senate as a Republican. He was an engineer for Boeing.

References

Living people
1929 births
Republican Party Washington (state) state senators
Republican Party members of the Washington House of Representatives